Edward Prest  (1824 - 1882) was  Archdeacon of Durham from 1863 until 1882.

He was born on 18 October 1824. He was educated at Uppingham and St John's College, Cambridge; and ordained deacon in 1846, and priest in 1847.
He was Chaplain of Sherburn Hospital after which he held incumbencies at Gateshead (1861- 1862) then Ryton-on-Tyne (1881-1882).

He died on October 27, 1882.

References

Archdeacons of Durham
1824 births
1882 deaths
Alumni of St John's College, Cambridge
People educated at Uppingham School